The Karakachan dog is a breed that originated from Bulgaria. It is related to the livestock guardian dogs of the surrounding countries: Romania to the north, North Macedonia and Serbia to the west, and Greece and Turkey to the south. The dog is named after the Karakachans, Greek nomadic shepherds. Due to their conservative stock-breeding traditions, they have preserved some of the oldest breeds of domestic animals in Europe: the Karakachan sheep, Karakachan horse and the Karakachan dog.

In the past, this dog was widely used in Bulgaria as a border army watchdog. Nowadays it is used primarily as a livestock guardian dog and property guard dog. The most numerous populations of working purebred livestock guarding Karakachan dogs are found in Bulgaria and the United States. The Karakachan was officially recognised as a Bulgarian native breed in 2005. They are part of the origin of the Bulgarian Shepherd, but should not be confused as the same breed.

History
The Karakachan dog is a typical livestock guardian dog, created for guarding its owner's flock and property; it does not hesitate to fight wolves or bears to defend its owner and his family in case of danger. Its ancestors started forming as early as the third millennium BC. The Karakachan dog is a descendant of the dogs of the Thracians, renowned as stock-breeders. The dog is named after the Karakachans. Due to their conservative stock-breeding traditions, they managed to preserve some of the oldest breeds of domestic animals in Europe – the Karakachan sheep, the Karakachan horse, and, of course, the Karakachan dog. It is with this name that the Karakachan dog appears in the works of some of the classics of Bulgarian literature, namely Yordan Yovkov, Georgi Raitchev and Yordan Radichkov. In 1938 H. B. Peters wrote about it in the German cynological magazine, "Zeitschrift für Hundeforschung". The first researcher of the breed was Todor Gajtandjiev, who proposed the standardization of the breed in the 1970s.

Etymology
The Karakachans (as they are called in Bulgaria), Sărăceni (as they are called in Romania), or Sarakatsani (as they call themselves) are a population of ethnically Greek nomads that have lived throughout the Balkan peninsula, but today have largely assimilated into local populations.

Breed standard
The official breed standard was written in 1991 and approved in 2005 by the State Commission for Animal Breeds within Ministry of Agriculture of Republic of Bulgaria. The breed has Certificate for recognition no. BG 10675 P2.
They are registered in the International Karakachan Data Base in Bulgaria. Registrations will show MAKK or IKDA . Only those dogs are of the "true" Karakachan bloodline.

Appearance

Important proportions: The length of the body measures the same as the height at withers + X%
 in male dogs X = 4–10%
 in females X = 6–15%
 the height at the elbow = 52–55% of the height at withers
 the length of the muzzle = 43–45% of the length of the head

Behaviour / temperament: proud, domineering, wary to strangers, brave and intelligent dog of tough, steady and independent character. It has a typical deep solid bark.

Head
Cranial region: The skull is broad and massive; the upper profile is slightly rounded with a shallow furrow on the forehead; the occipital bone is slightly pronounced. The supercilliary arches are only slightly developed. The axes of the muzzle and the cranial region are parallel.

Stop: Visible but not emphasized.

Facial region
 Muzzle: Massive, widening at the base, shorter than the cranial part of the skull. Tapering very gradually from its set to the nose leather, ending flat.
 Nose leather: Large and well-pigmented. Wide nostrils.
 Lips: Thick and close-fitting. The upper lip covers the lower. Well-pigmented.
 Jaws (teeth): Strong jaws. 42 teeth – 20 in the upper jaw and 22 in the lower jaw. Large and white teeth, well adapted to each other. Scissor bite or pincer bite.
 Eyes: Small, deep and obliquely placed in the skull, with the lateral angles higher than the medial ones. Dark or hazel depending on the colour of the coat. The rim of the eyelid is dark pigmented. Expression is grim, confident, intelligent and firm.
 Ears: Rather small, low set, V-shaped, pendant, close-fitting to the skull.
 Neck: Short and powerful. Well-connected with the body and head. Angled at approximately 30o to the upper line. No pendant folds apart from a slight dewlap along the ventral part of the neck.

Body
 Upper line: Horizontal, straight.
 Withers: Well-pronounced, long and muscular.
 Back: Straight, broad and well-muscled.
 Loins: Medium length, broad, well-muscled. Pronounced above the upper line.
 Croup: Medium length, broad and slightly sloping. Rounded and muscular.
 Chest: Deep and broad but not barrel-shaped. Reaching deep at least to the points of elbow.
 Under line and belly: The belly is muscular, taut and slightly tucked up.

Tail
Not very high set. It reaches to the hock joints but can also be short by birth. The coat on tail is long and rough. In repose it hangs low or the tip is curved. In movement or when the dog is alert, it is carried over the back in sabre form or curled.

Limbs
 Forequarters: Straight, parallel, massive.
 Shoulders and upper arm: Long and broad. Tightly joined to the body, well-muscled. Angle between shoulder blade and shoulder bone is approximately 105°.
 Elbow: Close-fitting to chest.
 Forearm: Long, bone-sturdy.
 Carpus: Strong and broad.
 Pastern: Slightly sloping. Broad and strong.
 Front feet: Large, round, with taut, compact toes. Arched and hairy. Elastic dark pads. Toenails are thick and strong, preferably dark-coloured.
 Hindquarters: Parallel, powerful, with moderate angulation.
 Thigh: Medium length, broad, well-muscled.
 Lower thigh: Long, broad and muscular.
 Hock: Broad and taut. The tibial-tarsus angle is about 140°.

Gait/movement
Long reaching. Preferred movement is the springy trot.

Skin
Thick, elastic and closely fitting. No flabs apart from a slight dewlap along the lower (ventral) part of the neck. The nose leather and the visible mucus membranes should be black-pigmented and for red-white dogs should be brown.

Coat
Quality of hair: In hair length there are two types:
 longhaired – length of coat on the body should measure over 12 cm.
 shorthaired – length of coat on the body, neck and limbs measures up to 12 cm.

Over the neck, withers, croup, at the back of legs, and on the tail the hair is long and rough. The topcoat is straight and stiff. Over the head and the front part of the legs the hair is short and close-fitting. Heavy undercoat.

Colour of hair: Two or tricolour, with spots. Most desired are clearly defined dark spots on white or big white spots on dark.

Height at the withers
 Males: 63–75 cm.
 Females: 60–69 cm.

Weight
 Males: 40–55 kg
 Females: 35–45 kg

Faults
Any departure from the foregoing points should be considered a fault and the seriousness with which the fault should be regarded should be in exact proportion to its degree.
 head insufficiently massive and broad
 pointed muzzle
 stop insufficiently pronounced or too prominent
 occipital bone too protruded
 eyes protruded or round
 ears set high or not close-fitting to the head
 lack of pigmentation
 neck long or too short
 prominent dewlap on the neck
 narrow or shallow chest
 soft back
 rounded back
 tail low set
 crooked legs, O-shaped or X-shaped
 pasterns too sloping or straight
 hock angles sharp or straight
 brindle coloration
 black mask

Eliminating faults
 resemblance to other breeds: Caucasian Shepherd Dog, Central Asian Shepherd Dog, Sharplaninets, Landseer, etc.
 overshot
 undershot, with gap between the incisors of more than 3 mm.
 phlegmatic temperament
 timid temperament
 unreasonable aggressiveness
 one-colored coat
 straight tail
 soft and/or curly hair
 no undercoat
N.B. Male dogs should have two apparently normal testicles fully descended into the scrotum.

Effectiveness
The Karakachan belongs to the rare livestock protection breeds. The dogs are effective at flock protection against predation and theft. Since 1998, there have been three cases of successful predator attacks in the flocks provided with dogs for this project. In one flock of 650 sheep, four had been killed, but this was due to the shepherds dividing the flock in half during grazing, and one half had been left without dogs.

The Karakachan dog is strictly territorial. It accepts the flock as its territory, wherever it is. Being close to the flock, they become visibly aggressive if the flock is threatened. If a stranger tries to remove an animal from the flock, the dogs will become seriously aggressive. However, when a flock is passing through a village the dogs walk calmly without paying attention to people. There is another reason for the lack of accidents: the tradition of guarding livestock with big, aggressive dogs has always existed in Bulgaria. Everyone knows about them and people simply avoid the flocks, so conflicts do not occur. Also there are dogs, which are not really aggressive towards people, but in the same time are excellent guards against other animal predators. The trends in breeding these dogs are to produce offspring less aggressive towards people.

Creation of new breeds
Some amateur dog fans in Bulgaria creating new big dog show breed with which the Karakachan dog should not be confused. These are cross-breeds of Karakachan dogs with giant breeds such as Caucasian Ovcharka, Central Asian Ovcharka, Moscow Watchdog, Saint Bernard, Landseer and Newfoundland. The goal is to create giant, heavy dogs similar in coloration to the native Karakachan dog. These new dogs are bred mostly as pets.

Popular culture
When U.S. President George W. Bush visited Bulgaria in 2003, the Bulgarian president Georgi Parvanov presented him with a Karakachan Shepherd. The Bulgarian Prime Minister Boyko Borisov gave a Karakachan dog, called Buffy to Russian PM Vladimir Putin as a gift in 2010.

See also
 Dogs portal
 List of dog breeds

References

Notes

External links

Dog breeds originating in Bulgaria
Livestock guardian dogs